Jerry Reary (born December 4, 1961) is a former American stock car racing driver and crew chief from Matthews, North Carolina. Reary competed in 3 NASCAR Xfinity Series races in 2003. Reary also served as crew chief for Brian Sockwell for one race during the 2008 NASCAR Craftsman Truck Series.

Motorsports career results

NASCAR
(key) (Bold – Pole position awarded by qualifying time. Italics – Pole position earned by points standings or practice time. * – Most laps led.)

Busch Series

References

External links
 
 

Living people
1961 births
NASCAR drivers
Racing drivers from Charlotte, North Carolina
Racing drivers from North Carolina
People from Matthews, North Carolina